Halil Zeybek (born 23 August 1985) is a Turkish professional footballer who most recently played for Halide Edip Adıvar SK.

References

External links
 Player profile at TFF.org

1985 births
Living people
People from Üsküdar
Turkish footballers
Süper Lig players
Fenerbahçe S.K. footballers
Kartalspor footballers
Erzurumspor footballers
Bursaspor footballers
Giresunspor footballers
Çaykur Rizespor footballers
Diyarbakırspor footballers
Footballers from Istanbul
Yeni Malatyaspor footballers
Association football midfielders
Association football forwards